Bullen Point Short Range Radar Site  (LRR Site: A-20) was a United States Air Force radar site and military airstrip located  east-southeast of Point Barrow, Alaska. It is not open for public use.

History
The site was built in 1957 to support the Distant Early Warning Line radar station at Point Lay (LIZ-2). The station was logistically  supported by the Point Barrow Main DEW Line Station (POW-MAIN).  It was operated by civilian contract workers.  DEW Line operations ceased in  April 1995, and the personnel were relieved from their duties.

The radar station was upgraded with new radars and in 1994 was re-designated part of the North Warning System (NWS) as a Short Range Radar Site, A-20, equipped with a minimally attended AN/FPS-124 surveillance radar.  In 1998, Pacific Air Forces initiated "Operation Clean Sweep", in which abandoned Cold War stations in Alaska were remediated and the land restored to its previous state.  The site remediation of the radar and support station was carried out by the 611th Civil Engineering Squadron at Elmendorf AFB, and remediation work was completed by 2005.

The site was closed in 2007 due to soil erosion and budget concerns.  The support airport's status is presently undetermined.

See also
 North Warning System
 Distant Early Warning Line
 Alaskan Air Command
 Eleventh Air Force

References 

  Bullen Point Short Range Radar Site
 Bullen Point Air Force Station

Radar stations of the United States Air Force
Installations of the United States Air Force in Alaska
Defunct airports in Alaska
Airports in North Slope Borough, Alaska
Buildings and structures in North Slope Borough, Alaska
Military installations established in 1957
1957 establishments in Alaska
2007 disestablishments in Alaska
Military installations closed in 2007